Sabahattin Hamamcıoğlu (born 13 February 1966) is a Turkish alpine skier. He competed in two events at the 1984 Winter Olympics.

References

1966 births
Living people
Turkish male alpine skiers
Olympic alpine skiers of Turkey
Alpine skiers at the 1984 Winter Olympics
People from Bitlis
20th-century Turkish people